Mohammad Ismail (born 13 January 1997) is a Pakistani cricketer. He made his first-class debut for National Bank of Pakistan in the 2017–18 Quaid-e-Azam Trophy on 9 October 2017. He made his Twenty20 debut for Rawalpindi in the 2017–18 National T20 Cup on 23 November 2017. He made his List A debut for Rawalpindi in the 2018–19 Quaid-e-Azam One Day Cup on 6 September 2018. In January 2021, he was named in Northern's squad for the 2020–21 Pakistan Cup.

References

External links
 

1997 births
Living people
Pakistani cricketers
National Bank of Pakistan cricketers
Rawalpindi cricketers
Place of birth missing (living people)